Curentul is a Romanian newspaper, based in Bucharest. It was founded in January 1928 by Pamfil Șeicaru and relaunched in October 1997. Before 1944, Șeicaru had written daily the main editorial of Curentul since 1928.

References

External links
 FOCUS: 20 de ani de ziare – între idealismul dat de libertate şi afacere, în capitalism  
 curentul.ro  

Publications established in 1928
Newspapers published in Bucharest
Romanian-language newspapers
History of Bucharest